Mahmudur Rahman Manna is a Bangladeshi politician and a media personality. He was former Organizing Secretary of the ruling party Bangladesh Awami League. The Wall Street Journal described him as a "fierce critic of the government". He was arrested after a leaked conversion where he was asked if he would agree to talk to an army officer who was not named.

Biography
Manna was born to Afsar Uddin Ahmed and Meher Akhter in Bogura district. 

He is married to Meher Nigar.

He was former vice president of Dhaka University Central Students' Union (DUCSU) and former general secretary of Chittagong University Central Student Union (CUCSU).

He is the co-founding convener of Nagorik Oikko, a civil society platform of Bangladesh.

He was arrested by Rapid Action Battalion on 25 February 2015, after a leaked conversation with Bangladesh Nationalist Party (BNP) leader Sadeque Hossain Khoka, on which he called for a stronger movement against the Bangladesh Awami league government. In the conversation he advised Khoka to seize Dhaka University dormitories. He talked with another unidentified person who suggested contacting Bangladesh Army officers to make a change in the government. The National Human Rights Commission of Bangladesh had called for his arrest. One the other hand, Nagorik Oikko demanded his immediate release. Former Prime Minister Khaleda Zia also demanded for his release. Manna was released on bail in November, 2016.

References

Living people
University of Dhaka alumni
Awami League politicians
1948 births
Dhaka College alumni